"N' Dey Say" is a song by American rapper Nelly. It was released on January 24, 2005, as the third and final single from his album Suit (2004). The song uses a musical sample of "True" by Spandau Ballet, so songwriter Gary Kemp was given a writing credit. The song reached number 64 on the US Billboard Hot 100 and entered the top 20 in Australia, Finland, Ireland, New Zealand, and the United Kingdom.

Music video
The video directed by Chris Robinson presents comparison of different lifestyles while putting an accent on their similarities (like war is equal with street gang rivalries in the civil life). It is brought into effect with a comic-like city background with strong strokes that seems like a merge of a photo and a drawing. This "in-between" feeling is realized by masking the background with a non-lifelike orange pattern. Using Bluescreen technology to separate the actors/artists from the background the performers remain realistic and stand out from the whole picture. The casting includes Gabriel Casseus (from Lockdown) as the patron of a homeless and Faune A. Chambers (from White Chicks) as the mourning widow and the St. Lunatics as cameos.

Track listings

UK CD1 and Australian CD single
 N' Dey Say" – 3:34
 N' Dey Say" (Shake Ya Cookie remix) – 3:31
 N' Dey Say" (Craig Groove remix) – 3:54
 "Another One" – 4:39

UK CD2 and European CD single
 N' Dey Say"
 N' Dey Say" (Shake Ya Cookie remix)

UK 12-inch vinyl
A1. N' Dey Say"
A2. "Another One"
B1. N' Dey Say" (Shake Ya Cookie remix)
B2. N' Dey Say" (Craig Groove remix)

Credits and personnel
Credits are taken from the Australian CD single liner notes.

Studios
 Recorded at Derrty Studios (Los Angeles) and Basement Beats Studios (St. Louis)
 Mixed at Platinum Sound Recording (New York City)

Personnel
 Nelly – lyrics, music, vocals
 Jayson "Koko" Bridges – music, drums, production
 Gary Kemp – music
 Carl Nappa – recording
 Rich Travali – mixing
 Chip Karpells – mixing assistant

Charts

Weekly charts

Year-end charts

Release history

References

External links
 

2004 songs
2005 singles
Materialism
Music videos directed by Chris Robinson (director)
Nelly songs
Songs written by Gary Kemp
Songs written by Nelly
Universal Records singles